James Isaac Wendell (September 3, 1890 – November 22, 1958) was an American athlete who won the silver medal competed in the 110 m hurdles at the 1912 Summer Olympics.

After retiring from competitions, Wendell had a successful career in education.  He was a master of English and assistant track coach at The Hill School (1913–1928), a boarding school in Pottstown, Pennsylvania, where he was subsequently named headmaster (1928–1952).  A teammate of his on the 1912 Olympic Team, General George S. Patton, later sent his son to The Hill while Wendell was headmaster.  During Wendell's tenure as headmaster Hill graduate William ("Bill") Franklin Porter II, class of 1944, won a gold medal in the 110-meters hurdles at the 1948 Summer Olympics.

In 2008, Wendell was named to Wesleyan University's Athletic Hall of Fame.  He graduated from the school in 1913, having broken several track and field records in his time at the school.

References

1890 births
1958 deaths
Wesleyan University alumni
American male hurdlers
Olympic silver medalists for the United States in track and field
Athletes (track and field) at the 1912 Summer Olympics
Medalists at the 1912 Summer Olympics
The Hill School faculty
American school principals
20th-century American educators